Splatter Beach is a 2007 low-budget horror comedy film directed by the Polonia brothers and starring Erin Brown, Erika Smith, Alison Whitney, Brice Kennedy, Ken Van Sant and Dave Fife. It was released on DVD by Camp Motion Pictures.

The screenplay concerns a reporter who hopes to write a story on a series of disappearances that have plagued a local beach, and who finds instead a sea monster in full rubbery attire.

References

External links

2007 horror films
2007 comedy horror films
2007 films
2007 comedy films
Films directed by Mark Polonia
Films set on beaches
2000s English-language films
American comedy horror films